Earth Defense Force, known in Japan as , is a series of third-person shooter video games. The series is published by the Japanese company D3 Publisher as part of the Simple series.

Story
In 2013, radio waves from deep space are picked up by scientists, proving the existence of extraterrestrial life. The Earth Defense Force, a unified multinational military, is founded a few years later, in case the aliens prove to be hostile. In each of the games the player assumes the role of an EDF soldier during an alien invasion.

Games

Main series

Monster Attack (2003)
The first game in the series was originally released in Japan as Simple 2000 series Vol. 31: The 地球防衛軍 for the PlayStation 2. Chikyū Bōeigun or Earth Defense Force was created by Sandlot as part of D3 Publisher's Simple series of budget-priced games on a compact disk. It was later distributed in PAL format on CD in Europe by Agetec, Inc. under the title Monster Attack.

Global Defence Force (2005)

Chikyū Bōeigun 2 is the second game in the series, released for the PlayStation 2. The game was released in Europe as Global Defence Force but was not released in North America. A PlayStation Portable version of the game, titled Earth Defense Forces 2 Portable was released on April 7, 2011, in Japan. A remake for the PlayStation Vita, entitled Earth Defense Force 2: Invaders from Planet Space (or Earth Defense Forces 2 Portable V2 in Japan), was released on December 11, 2014, in Japan, with a North American port released on December 8, 2015.

Earth Defense Force 2017 (2006)

Earth Defense Force 2017, known in Japan as Chikyū Bōeigun 3 is the third game in the series, released for the Xbox 360. It was the first game in the series to be released in North America. A PlayStation Vita version of Earth Defense Force 3 was announced on June 5, 2012, as Earth Defense Forces 3 Portable. The new version includes both local and online co-operative play, as well as the return of Palewing from Earth Defense Force 2. The game was released on September 27, 2012, in Japan. A port of the game is planned to be released for the Nintendo Switch in Japan on October 14, 2021.

Earth Defense Force 2025 (2013)

Earth Defense Force 2025, known in Japan as Chikyū Bōeigun 4, was released for the Xbox 360 and PlayStation 3 on July 4, 2013, in Japan. Developed by Sandlot, it is a direct sequel to Earth Defense Force 2017. It features four player online co-operative play. It was released in February 2014 in North America and Europe.

Earth Defense Force 4.1: The Shadow of New Despair, an updated port, was released for the PlayStation 4 on April 2, 2015, in Japan and on December 8, 2015, in North America. Europe has an estimated release date for February 12, 2016, and European players are able to play with North American players online according to Ryan Graff from publisher XSEED Games. A Nintendo Switch version is planned to be release in Japan in 2022.

Earth Defense Force 5 (2017)

Earth Defense Force 5 was announced at TGS 2016, and was released on December 7, 2017,  for the PlayStation 4 in Japan. The game was released on December 11, 2018, in North America and Europe.

Earth Defense Force 6 (2022) 
Earth Defense Force 6 is a sequel to Earth Defense Force 5 and was released on August 25, 2022 for the PlayStation 4 and PlayStation 5 in Japan.

Spin-offs

Global Defence Force Tactics (2006)

Chikyū Bōeigun: Tactics, known as Global Defence Force Tactics in Europe, is a turn-based strategy game, taking place after the events of Global Defence Force.

Earth Defense Force: Insect Armageddon (2011)

Earth Defense Force: Insect Armageddon is the fourth game in the series, released for the Xbox 360, PlayStation 3 and Windows. It was the first game in the series to be developed outside Japan and also the first to feature online co-operative play.

Earth Defense Force: Iron Rain (2019)

Earth Defense Force: Iron Rain was announced at TGS 2017. Under development by Yuke's, the game has been described as "more serious than the series’ traditional campy tone." The game was released on April 11, 2019 for the PlayStation 4 worldwide.

Earth Defense Force: World Brothers (2020)
Earth Defense Force: World Brothers was announced on June 23, 2020 as an action spin-off with voxel graphics for the Nintendo Switch, PlayStation 4 and PC. Developed by Yuke's, the game was released on December 24, 2020 in Japan and on May 27, 2021 in North America and Europe.

Reception

Despite generally mixed reviews, the Earth Defense Force series, particularly from Earth Defense Force 2017 and onwards, has been described as having a cult following. Joe Juba of Game Informer defined Earth Defense Force 2017 as a cult classic, stating that "the developers at Sandlot clearly want to tell a story about humanity's struggle against giant invading ants and robots, and the passion for that story shines through despite its technical shortcomings"; in reviewing Earth Defense Force 5 five years later, he similarly opined that the series has "always had a single-minded commitment to one simple truth: It's fun to use weird weapons to blast lots of aliens." Though Jim Sterling gave Earth Defense Force 2025 a negative review, they did acknowledge that the series "has managed to earn itself a fierce cult following through audacity alone".

Notes

References

External links
  

 
Alien invasions in video games
Bandai Namco Entertainment franchises
Military science fiction video games
Sandlot games
Third-person shooters
Video game franchises
Video game franchises introduced in 2003
Video games about insects